Clinton Daniel Gladden III (born July 7, 1957) is an American former Major League Baseball player and current radio broadcaster. He was the starting left fielder with the Minnesota Twins' two World Series Championship teams in 1987 and 1991.

Baseball career
Known as "The Dazzle Man", he attended California State University, Fresno and was signed by the San Francisco Giants as an amateur free agent in 1979. He made his debut with the Giants in 1983, and in 1984 he batted .351 with 31 stolen bases as the Giants' center fielder.

In 1987, Gladden was traded to the Minnesota Twins, and won a World Series championship with them in his first year. In Game 1, he hit the first grand slam in a World Series game in 17 years. In the intense and memorable Game 7 of the 1991 Series, Gladden stretched a broken bat bloop hit into a double before scoring the winning run on Gene Larkin's single off of Atlanta's Alejandro Peña, in the bottom of the 10th inning.

After the 1991 season, Gladden signed as a free agent with the Detroit Tigers, and played with them until 1993. He spent 1994 in Japan playing for the Yomiuri Giants, winning a Japan Series championship. Because of the 1994–95 MLBPA strike, Gladden's championship with the kyojin is regarded by some fans as a world championship, and he retired from the game as a player on top as a three-time world champion with the distinction of having won championships in two continents (as does teammate Hideki Matsui, who won the World Series in 2009 with the New York Yankees). He returned to the Twins as a scout (spring training, 1995), then the Colorado Rockies (advance, 1996–1998) and spent 1999 as a roving instructor for the San Francisco Giants.

Gladden was one of seven Twins to be part of both the 1987 and 1991 World Series teams.  The other six were Randy Bush, Greg Gagne, Kirby Puckett, Al Newman, Gene Larkin, and Kent Hrbek.

In an 11-year major league career covering 1,196 games, Gladden hit .270 (1215-for-4501) with 663 runs, 74 home runs, 446 RBI, and 222 stolen bases. In the 1987 and 1991 post-season with the Minnesota Twins, in 24 games he batted .279 (29-for-104), scoring 17 runs, with one home run, 15 RBI and 7 stolen bases.

Broadcasting career
In 2000, Gladden became the color commentator on the Twins' radio network broadcast, most notably on WCCO-AM through 2006 and on the Twins Radio Network and its Metro Affiliate KSTP starting in 2007.  He worked alongside Frick award-winning commentator Herb Carneal and the Twins' play-by-play man, John Gordon; Carneal died on April 1, 2007, leaving Gladden to deliver color commentary full-time.

Personal life
Gladden met his wife, Janice Murphy, while they were both attending De Anza College and they were married on July 7, 1979. Janice's father played Negro league baseball. They had two daughters together, one of whom married and had a child with Gary Gaetti's son. Gladden settled with his wife in Eden Prairie, Minnesota.

See also

List of Major League Baseball career stolen bases leaders

References

External links

Minnesota Twins Broadcasters
Pura Pelota

1957 births
Living people
American expatriate baseball players in Japan
Baseball players from San Jose, California
California State University, Fresno alumni
Colorado Rockies scouts
Detroit Tigers players
Fresno Giants players
Fresno State Bulldogs baseball players
Major League Baseball broadcasters
Minnesota Twins announcers
Minnesota Twins players
Phoenix Firebirds players
Phoenix Giants players
San Francisco Giants players
Shreveport Captains players
Tigres de Aragua players
American expatriate baseball players in Venezuela
Toledo Mud Hens players
Yomiuri Giants players
De Anza Dons baseball players